Herbert Neil Travis (October 12, 1936 – March 28, 2012) was an American film and television editor with about 28 feature film credits from 1970–2007. He is likely best known for editing the television miniseries Roots (1977) and the feature film Dances with Wolves (1990).

Travis was born in Los Angeles, California, and received a bachelor's degree in film and theater arts from the University of California, Los Angeles.

Travis won the Primetime Emmy Award for Outstanding Film Editing In A Drama Series for the first part of the television miniseries Roots (1977), and he and James Heckert were nominated for the award for the second part as well. Travis won the Academy Award for Best Film Editing and the American Cinema Editors Eddie for the film Dances with Wolves (directed by Kevin Costner-1990). Travis had been selected as a member of the American Cinema Editors, and received the Career Achievement Award in 2010.

In 2010, Travis was interviewed about his career by Karen Herman for the Archive of American Television.

Filmography (Editor)

The director of each film is indicated in parenthesis.

 Premonition                            -------(Yapo-2007)
 Terminator 3: Rise of the Machines                             -------(Mostow-2003; coeditor-Nicolas de Toth)
 The Sum of All Fears               -------(Robinson-2002; additional editor-Nicolas de Toth)
 Along Came a Spider                 -------(Tamahori-2001; additional editor-Nicolas de Toth)
 Bicentennial Man                       -------(Columbus-1999; additional editor-Nicolas de Toth)
 Stepmom                                         -------(Columbus-1998)
 The Edge                                  -------(Tamahori-1997)
 Moll Flanders                        -------(Densham-1996; with James R. Symons)
 Outbreak                                       -------(Petersen-1995)
 Clear and Present Danger       -------(Noyce-1994)
 Bopha!                                                         -------(Freeman-1993)
 Patriot Games                             -------(Noyce-1992; with William Hoy)
 Deceived                                                       -------(Harris-1991)
 Dances with Wolves                                             -------(Costner-1990). Travis and Dean Semler (the film's cinematographer) did a commentary audio track for the Special Edition DVD release in 2003.
 Cocktail                                  -------(Donaldson-1988)
 No Way Out                              -------(Donaldson-1987; with William Hoy)
 Marie                                             -------(Donaldson-1985)
 The Philadelphia Experiment -------(Raffill-1984)
 Cujo                                               -------(Teague-1983)
 Second Thoughts                    -------(Turman-1983)
 Nobody's Perfekt                                               -------(Bonerz-1981)
 The Idolmaker                                                  -------(Hackford-1980)
 Nights at O'Rear's                                             -------(Mandel-1980)
 Die Laughing                               -------(Werner-1980)
 Hot Stuff                                -------(DeLuise-1979)
 Jaws 2                                                         -------(Szwarc-1978; with Arthur Schmidt and Steve Potter)
 The Cowboys                                                    -------(Rydell-1972; with Robert Swink)
 The Traveling Executioner                                      -------(Smight-1970)

Television Series (Writer)

 Please Don't Eat the Daisies

Awards

Academy Awards 1991, USA

Primetime Emmy Awards 1977, USA

American Cinema Editors 2010, USA

References

Further reading
 Interview with Travis about editing and the advent of digital filmmaking.
 Essay on the film that notes its editing.
 Obituary.

American Cinema Editors
People from Los Angeles
1936 births
2012 deaths
Best Film Editing Academy Award winners
UCLA Film School alumni
American television editors
American film editors